The First League of Montenegro (Montenegrin: Prva crnogorska fudbalska liga — Prva CFL — 1. CFL) is the top football league in Montenegro. Founded in 2006, competition is headed by the Football Association of Montenegro. 10 teams participate in this league. The winner of the Montenegrin First League starts the qualifications for the UEFA Champions League from the second round. The second and third placed team and Montenegrin Cup winner play in the qualifying rounds of the UEFA Conference League. The last placed team is directly relegated to the Montenegrin Second League, and the two next lowest ranked teams play in Montenegrin First League playoffs.

History

Before independence

As a part of the Kingdom of Yugoslavia, Montenegrin clubs played in the Montenegrin Football Championship which was formed in 1922. Despite the presence of the nationwide Yugoslav Football Championship, Montenegrin teams did not partake in it. Montenegrin Football Championship played until the beginning of World War II.

The most successful teams at that period were SK Crnogorac Cetinje (10 titles), GSK Balšić Podgorica (7), FK Lovćen Cetinje (5), FK Budućnost Podgorica (4) and FK Arsenal Tivat (1). While SK Crnogorac and GSK Balšić played all the seasons, work of FK Budućnost and FK Lovćen was forbidden in 1935, as they were recognized as workers' clubs by Kingdom of Yugoslavia government and forbidden.

After World War II and the formation of the Socialist Federal Republic of Yugoslavia, the top league became the Yugoslav First League. Montenegrin teams were allowed to partake in the nationwide league structure, with a Montenegrin Republic League acting as a lower-tier division with promotion and relegation between the Yugoslav league system. The most prominent clubs from Montenegro in this period were FK Budućnost and FK Sutjeska.

FK Budućnost was among the founders of Yugoslav First League and a member of its inaugural season. During the most of SFRY era, FK Budućnost played in First League, while another team from Montenegro in top-tier was FK Sutjeska. Other teams played in Yugoslav Second League or lower ranks. Among them, most successful was FK Lovćen, who played twice in First League qualifiers, but without success at the end of campaigns.

Below is the list of performances of Montenegrin teams in Yugoslav First League from 1946 to 1992, with final placements on every single season.

In 1992 when SFR Yugoslavia dissolved the Federal Republic of Yugoslavia was formed. Serbian and Montenegrin teams played in its national league, although it was still named Yugoslav First League. In 2003, FR Yugoslavia became Serbia and Montenegro and the football league was renamed. Montenegrin clubs played in the First League with Serbian clubs from 1992 to 2006. In that period, representatives of Montenegro in the Yugoslav/Serbia and Montenegro First League were FK Budućnost, FK Sutjeska, FK Rudar, FK Mogren, FK Zeta, FK Kom and FK Jedinstvo.

Below is the list of performances of Montenegrin teams in FR Yugoslavia First League from 1992 to 2006, with final placements on every single season.

For 2004–05, restructuring of the Serbo-Montenegrin football league system saw the dissolution of the national second league, instead being replaced by two regional divisions for both republics of the union with promotion to the still-united First League.

Montenegrin teams which played in European competitions during Yugoslav era were FK Budućnost, FK Sutjeska and FK Zeta.

After independence
In 2006, after the Independence referendum, Montenegro split from Serbia. Following that, Montenegrin First League is founded as top-tier national competition. On inaugural season, members of League became three teams from former First League of Serbia and Montenegro, seven from Second League, and two from Montenegrin Republic League.

Between 2006 and 2017, the league consisted on 12 clubs, which played 33 matches during the season. From the 2017-18 season the number of participants in the Montenegrin First League was reduced to 10, with a 36 week-long competition.

20 clubs have participated in the Montenegrin First League. The most successful were FK Sutjeska with four titles and FK Budućnost three national titles. FK Rudar and FK Mogren won two titles. Other winners were FK Zeta and OFK Titograd with one title.

2006–16

The first game in Prva CFL was played on 11 August 2006 in Pljevlja. In front of 5,000 spectators, a game between the home side FK Rudar and FK Budućnost, finished with a victory of the away team (0-2). In the fifth minute of that match, Ivan Čarapić (Budućnost) scored the first goal in the history of Prva CFL.

The first champion of the top-tier CFL was Zeta, who won the trophy on the championship's final weekend, after a hard struggle with neighbouring Budućnost. Game between FK Berane and FK Budućnost was not even finished, after the crowd disturbances during the second half. A third derby between Budućnost and Zeta in Podgorica was attended by 10,000 spectators, which is a record-high attendance in the history of CFL. During the season, many games were disrupted by crowd disturbances and a match between Zeta and Budućnost in Golubovci was not played, after the decision was made by the home team not to open their stadium following discussion with Football Association of Montenegro. 

Next season started with incidents during the Montenegrin Derby in Nikšić. Budućnost won the title, with the same number of points as Zeta and Mogren. But, Budućnost had the best score against two opponents from the top of the table. This marked the first trophy for the team from Podgorica. Their manager at that time Branko Babić became the first foreign coach to win the Prva CFL title. With an average attendance of 4,250 for their home games, Budućnost made a Montenegrin First League all-time record.

The title winners for season 2008–09 became Mogren, the first-ever club from the coastal Montenegro to win the title. The race for the champions' trophy lasted until the final week, when Mogren won an away game against Jedinstvo (2-1). At the end of season, they had four points more than second-placed Budućnost and 11 more than the third-place team - Sutjeska.

A year later Rudar won the first title in their club's history. They won the trophy after dramatic struggle with Budućnost, and only two points decided the championship race. During that year, Ivan Bošković from Grbalj scored 28 goals, which is the all-time record for one single season. During the last week of season, his team made another record, with the highest victory ever in Montenegrin First League, against Kom (11-0). During that game, Bošković scored four goals - which is another Prva CFL record, shared with FK Zeta's player Miljan Vlaisavljević and OFK Titograd's player Zoran Petrović.

Mogren became first club to win a second champion trophy in Prva CFL. The team from Budva won the title on season 2010–11, but with equal number of points as second-placed Budućnost: (73). In the end, head-to-head scores compared, Mogren were victorious over Budućnost (2-1; 2-0; 1-2).

Budućnost won their second trophy in season 2011–12, whilst also setting records for highest number of points in CFL by single season (80) and highest number of scored goals by season (83). But, the team from Podgorica didn't win the trophy easily - they were followed by Rudar, who trailed by three points at the end of season. Additionally, Budućnost failed to beat Rudar during the season (0-2; 2-2; 1-1)

Sutjeska became the first club to win two consecutive titles of CFL champion - both times with Dragan Radojičić as head coach. The team from Nikšić won the title for seasons 2012–13 and 2013–14. Sutjeska headed to their first title with five points more than Budućnost, but secured the trophy on last week of the season. During that season, Sutjeska for the first time in the First League played city derbies against Čelik (1-0; 0-3; 0-1), who placed third at the end of competition. Second trophy, Sutjeska won after the dramatic spring half-season and struggle with Lovćen. The title winner was decided a week before the end of season, after a draw between Sutjeska and Lovćen (1-1). That was the first season on which Budućnost didn't finish in first or second position.

At the end of season 2014–15, Rudar won the second title in the club's history. The team from Pljevlja won the race against title holders Sutjeska, who finished second. The team at the bottom of the table - Berane at the end of season had only 13 points with 78 goals conceded, which were negative records of Prva CFL at that time. After the relegation playoffs, Mogren were relegated to the Second League. This was the first time in history of Prva CFL that former champions were relegated.

The tenth edition of Prva CFL finished with a shock, as OFK Titograd from Podgorica won their first-ever national title. During this era, OFK Titograd played under the name Mladost Podgorica. They won the champions' race against city rivals from Budućnost and during the season, OFK Titograd won all three games against them (3-1; 1-0; 2-0). After the last week, OFK Titograd had four points more than the second-placed team.

In the period from 2006 to 2016, FK Budućnost, FK Sutjeska, FK Rudar and FK Mogren won two champion titles, and FK Zeta and OFK Titograd one. During that time, 19 clubs participated in Prva CFL.

2016–present

FK Budućnost won their third champions' title on season 2016-17, but with equal number of points as Zeta and OFK Titograd. During the season, six points were deducted from FK Zeta because of irregularities, so they weren't able to win the trophy. Week before the end of season, on Budućnost - OFK Titograd match, ultras of home team burned a part of north stand at Podgorica City Stadium, and the game was interrupted and registered with result 0–3. But, that epilog did not have influence on final placement, as Budućnost finished on the top of the table, with better head-to-head score against OFK Titograd and Zeta.

Next season, FK Sutjeska won their third title. Team from Nikšić dominated from the very beginning of championship and secured the trophy after 30 weeks. Except that, Sutjeska made a new league record with 11 games without conceded goal. They finished season with 22 points more than second-placed Budućnost.

Season 2018–19 started with the poorest performances of Montenegrin clubs in European competitions since independence. Four teams played 10 games in Champions league and Europa League qualifiers, but without any single win. During the season, FK Sutjeska and FK Budućnost have battle for champions' title and 100th Montenegrin Derby in Nikšić was followed by huge incidents after the game, with numerous wounded ultras and policemen. Week before the end, FK Sutjeska won the title - fourth in team's history. At the same time, Nikola Rakojević became the first manager to win three titles. That was the second time in Prva CFL that one club retained the title - both times it did Sutjeska. During the same season, Mornar finished with 12 points and only one victory from 36 games, which is the all-time negative record in Prva CFL.

Season 2019–20 started with the title race between FK Budućnost and FK Sutjeska, but the championship was interrupted in March 2020, after 23 weeks, due to the coronavirus pandemic. At that time, FK Budućnost was a leader, with 11 points more than FK Sutjeska. Two months after that, Football Association of Montenegro decided that Prva CFL will be continued on 30 May and that the season will last until 28 July. But, at the beginning of July, due to COVID-19 case among FK Budućnost players, Football Association of Montenegro decided to stop every official competition. Because of that, placement after 31 week was the final one. Therefore, FK Budućnost became a new champion. The team from Podgorica secured the title before the final interruption, as they have 18 points more than second-placed squad. Except that, FK Sutjeska, FK Iskra and FK Zeta qualified for European competitions, too. Last-placed OFK Grbalj was directly relegated to Druga CFL and FK Kom after the playoff games against FK Jezero.

FK Budućnost defended the trophy on season 2020-21 with 28 points more than second-placed FK Sutjeska. For the first time in teams' history, FK Dečić and FK Podgorica participated in European competition. From the other side, OFK Titograd was directly relegated, while FK Iskra and OFK Petrovac survived via playoffs.

After three years, FK Sutjeska won the new title on season 2021-22. FK Budućnost, which won previous two editions, finished as runner-up. Except them, FK Dečić and FK Iskra qualified for European competitions. Big battle for avoiding the relegation lasted until the final week and at the end, first champion of Montenegro, FK Zeta, directly went to Druga CFL, while FK Podgorica was relegated after the playoffs.

Changes in league structure
Number of teams:
 2006–07 to 2006–17: 12
 Since 2017–18: 10
Number of teams relegated:
 2006–07 to 2016–17: 1 automatic plus the 10th and 11th placed team in the First League played a two-leg relegation matches against the second and third placed team of the Second League.
 Since 2017–18: 1 automatic plus the 8th and 9th placed team in the First League plays a relegation matches against the second and third placed team of the Second League.

Rivalries

The main rivalry in the Montenegrin First League is between Budućnost and Sutjeska, often called the Montenegrin Derby. The first edition of the derby in official competitions was played at 1932, and the two clubs have played derbies in the highest-tier competitions of SFR Yugoslavia, FR Yugoslavia and in the Montenegrin First League.

Another traditional rivalry is between FK Budućnost and FK Lovćen Cetinje, because the two clubs have played important games since the 1920s. That rivalry is further fuelled by the fact that Budućnost is the major club from the capital Podgorica, while Lovćen is the main club from the former royal capital, Cetinje.

During the first two seasons of Montenegrin First League, there was a strong rivalry between Budućnost and Zeta. The two clubs from the territory of the Capital Podgorica were the main candidates for the title during the 2006-07 and 2007–08 seasons, and their match from the spring 2007 was attended by more than 10,000 spectators at Podgorica City Stadium. That is the highest attendance in the history of Montenegrin First League.

During the seasons of 2012-13 and 2013–14, there was a big local derby in Nikšić, between Sutjeska and Čelik. At that time, their matches were often attended by more than 7,000 supporters.

In the new period, there was a strong title races between Rudar and Budućnost or Sutjeska and Rudar.

Champions by season

Champions
Since its inception in the 2006–07 season, six clubs have won the title. As of the culmination of the 2020–21 season, Budućnost have won 5 titles, followed by Sutjeska with 4, while Rudar and Mogren each won 2. Only Budućnost and Sutjeska managed to retain their title in the following season; furthermore, Sutjeska managed to do so twice.

Key

Performance by club
Budućnost has won most titles, five in total; it is the only club which finished as a champion or runner-up more than 10 times. FK Lovćen is the only team which finished as a runner-up but never won any title.

Top scorers
Every season, the best scorer of Prva CFL is awarded with Radio Montenegro Trophy.

The most goals during a single season were scored by Ivan Bošković (28) during the season 2009–10. In two seasons, two players were joint top-scorers. Žarko Korać and Admir Adrović are the only players who were top-scorers in two seasons. The majority of top scorers during the single seasons were from Budućnost (4), followed by 3 which played for Sutjeska, OFK Titograd and Zeta.

Players and managers

Players

Appearances
Ivan Novović, with 431 appearances, is the most capped player in the history of the league. 

As of the end of 2021–22 season.
First = First season in Prva CFL; Last = Last season in Prva CFL
Sources:

Goalscorers
Since the foundation of Prva CFL, most goals in competition scored Admir Adrović. Playing for six teams, he scored overall 110 goals. Below is a list of the 5 best all-time goalscorers.

As of the end of 2021–22 season.
Clubs = Only Prva CFL teams for which every player scored at least one goal; First = Season of player's first goal in Prva CFL; Last = Season of player's last goal in Prva CFL
Sources:

Goalkeepers
From the first edition of Prva CFL, many goalkeepers made runs without conceded goals during the three or more games. Below is the list of three biggest runs from 2006 to 2007 edition until now, classified by minutes without conceded goal.

Managers
During the history, nine managers have won the title of Montenegrin First League champions. Among them, Nikola Rakojević won three titles. Dragan Radojičić and Dejan Vukićević did it twice. Rakojević and Radojičić are the managers which won more than one title with the same team (both with FK Sutjeska).

Awards
Every year, Football Association of Montenegro is organising awards ceremony for best player and best manager in Montenegrin First League. Best player and manager are chosen by coaches and captains of First League members. 

Player of the Year
 2008  Nikola Vujović (Mogren)
 2009  Ivan Vuković (Budućnost)
 2010  Ivan Vuković (Budućnost)
 2011  Dragan Bošković (Budućnost)
 2012  Blažo Igumanović (Rudar)
 2013  Darko Zorić (Čelik)
 2014  Vladimir Jovović (Sutjeska)
 2015  Marko Šćepanović (Titograd)
 2016  Radomir Đalović (Budućnost)
 2017  Igor Ivanović (Sutjeska)
 2018  Stefan Lončar (Sutjeska)
 2019  Marko Ćetković (Sutjeska)

Manager of the Year
 2008  Dejan Vukićević (Mogren)
 2009  Dejan Vukićević (Mogren)
 2010  Nebojša Vignjević (Rudar)
 2011  Dragan Radojičić (Rudar)
 2012  Slavoljub Bubanja (Čelik)
 2013  Dragan Radojičić (Sutjeska)
 2014  Dragan Radojičić (Budućnost)
 2015  Mirko Marić (Rudar)
 2016  Nikola Rakojević (Titograd)
 2017  Miodrag Vukotić (Budućnost)
 2018  Nikola Rakojević (Sutjeska)
 2019  Nikola Rakojević (Sutjeska)

All time tables

Montenegrin clubs in Yugoslav First League (1946–2006)

In period from 1946 to 2006, Montenegrin clubs played in the First league of SFR Yugoslavia (1946–1992), FR Yugoslavia (1992–2001) and Serbia and Montenegro (2001–2006). Below is the list of all matches and seasons by every single club in the First league from 1946 until 2006.

Prva CFL (2006–present)
Since its inauguration in 2006–07 season, 20 clubs have played in Montenegrin First League. Clubs that played all the seasons are Budućnost, Sutjeska, Rudar, Zeta and Petrovac.

Ssn = Number of seasons; First = First season; Last = Last season; Pld = Matches played; W = Matches won; D = Matches drawn; L = Matches lost; GF = Goals for; GA = Goals against; GD = Goal difference; Pts = Points

Participants by season

Relegation and promotion
At the end of every season, the last placed team are relegated to the Montenegrin Second League, while the winner of Second League is promoted to highest-rank. Additionally, another two teams from First and Second League every season are participating in the playoffs.

Directly promoted and relegated teams

Below is the list of directly promoted and relegated teams by every single season. Relegated were last-placed teams in First League, while directly promoted teams were the champions of Montenegrin Second League.

Playoffs

Montenegrin First League playoffs is a two legs tournament between the teams from Montenegrin First League which above direct relegation, and the teams from Montenegrin Second League which below the direct promotion. Below is the list of playoffs participants by every single season.

Records and statistics

Champions
Highest number of points when becoming a champions: 85 by Budućnost, season 2020–21
Lowest number of points when becoming a champions: 57 by Budućnost, season 2016–17
Highest number of games left when becoming a champions: 7 by Budućnost, season 2020–21 (Secured title: 11 April 2021).
Lowest number of seasons before becoming champions after being promoted: 5 by OFK Titograd (Promotion: 2010–11; Champions: 2015–16)
Lowest number of seasons before getting relegated for the champions:: 5 by Mogren (Champions: 2010–11; Relegation: 2014–15); OFK Titograd (Champions: 2015–16; Relegation: 2020–21)

Records by seasonsMost points: 85, Budućnost, season 2020–21Least points: 12, Mornar, season 2018–19Highest number of wins: 27, Budućnost, season 2020–21Lowest number of wins: 1, Mornar, season 2018–19Highest number of draws: 17, Rudar, season 2018–19Lowest number of draws: 3, Kom, season 2009–10Highest number of losses: 26, Berane, season 2014–15Lowest number of losses: 1, Budućnost, season 2006–07Highest number of scored goals: 82, Budućnost, season 2011–12Lowest number of scored goals: 16, Kom, season 2009–10; OFK Titograd, season 2007–08Highest number of conceded goals: 78, Berane, season 2014–15Lowest number of conceded goals: 12, Budućnost, season 2006–07Player with highest number of scored goals by single season: 28, Ivan Bošković, Grbalj, season 2009–10

RunsLongest unbeaten run: 23 matches, Budućnost, 22 September 2020 - 20 March 2021, season 2020–21Longest run without win: 30 matches, OFK Titograd, 19 May 2007 - 3 May 2008, seasons 2006–07, 2007–08Longest winning streak: 10 matches, Budućnost, 17 March 2012 - 9 May 2012, season 2011–12;  Budućnost, 31 October 2020 - 17 December 2020, season 2020–21Longest losing streak: 12 matches, Mornar, 17 March 2019 - 25 May 2019, season 2018–19Longest run without conceded goal: 11 matches, Sutjeska, 16 September 2017 - 6 December 2017, season 2017–18Longest run without scored goal: 11 matches, Kom, 30 September 2009 - 7 March 2010, season 2009–10Longest run of goalless matches (0-0): 3 matches, Grbalj, 15 September 2012 - 6 October 2012, season 2012–13; Grbalj, 13 October 2012 - 10 November 2012, season 2012–13

Single gameBiggest league victory/defeat: 11–0, Grbalj vs. Kom, 29 May 2010 (season 2009–10)Biggest league victory away: 0–7, Mornar vs. Grbalj, 23 May 2015 (season 2014–15)Most goals on a single game: 11, Grbalj vs. Kom 11–0, 29 May 2010 (season 2009–10); Zeta vs. Bokelj 8–3, 17 May 2008 (season 2007–08)Player with most goals on a single game: 4, Ivan Bošković (Grbalj), Grbalj vs. Kom 11–0, 29 May 2010 (season 2009–10); Miljan Vlaisavljević (Zeta), Zeta vs. Mogren 5–0, 4 April 2015 (season 2014–15); Zoran Petrović (OFK Titograd), OFK Titograd vs. Lovćen 7–2, 27 May 2017 (season 2016–17); Tyrone Conrad (Sutjeska), Sutjeska vs. Jedinstvo 5–0, 1 October 2022 (season 2022–23)Fastest goal: Aleksa Marušić (Sutjeska), 00:16; Titograd vs. Sutjeska 0–4, 03.04.2021 (season 2020–21)Oldest top scorer: Ivan Jablan (Lovćen), 39 yrs 143 days; Grbalj vs. Lovćen 3–2, 08.12.2018 (season 2018–19)

AttendanceHighest average attendance by season: 1,178 (overall: 229,800 / 195 matches), season 2006–07Highest single game attendance: 10,000, Budućnost vs. Zeta 1:0, 08.04.2007, Podgorica (season 2006–07)Lowest single game attendance: 50, OFK Titograd vs. Grbalj 1:2, 08.12.2007, Podgorica (season 2007–08)Highest average home attendance: 4,250 (16 home games), Budućnost during 2007–08 seasonLowest average home attendance: 206 (18 home games), Mornar during 2018–19 season

Attendance by season

M = Number of matches (only matches with spectators counted); H = Highest attendance on one match; CH = Club with highest average attendance; CL = Club with lowest average attendance

Current season (2022–23)

The 2022–23 Montenegrin First League is the 17th season of top-tier football in Montenegro. FK Sutjeska are the defending champions. The season will begin at 23 July 2022 and will end in May 2023. At the end of season, last-placed team will directly be relegated, and 9th and 8th club from the table will participate in playoffs.

The following 10 clubs compete in First League 2022–23.

Seasons in top division - including the season 2022-23.

Montenegrin clubs in European football competitions

History

Montenegrin football clubs have played in three UEFA competitions - the UEFA Champions League, UEFA Europe League (formerly UEFA Cup) and Intertoto Cup.

Champions of Montenegro have never played in the group-phase of UEFA Champions League, and the most successful in the qualifiers was FK Zeta Golubovci in the 2007–08 season and FK Sutjeska Nikšić in 2019–20.

FK Zeta had the best performances in the UEFA Europe League: reaching the playoffs, and OFK Titograd, FK Budućnost and FK Sutjeska which played in Round 3. The most successful in the Intertoto Cup was Budućnost, which was among the winners during the 1981 season.

Below is a table with Montenegrin clubs' scores in UEFA competitions.

As of the end of UEFA competitions 2020–21 season.

Except the official UEFA competitions, teams from Montenegro represented SFR Yugoslavia in the Balkans Cup, former regional football competition (1960-1994). Teams from Montenegro which played in Balkans Cup were FK Budućnost Podgorica and FK Sutjeska Nikšić. Biggest success made FK Budućnost, who played in the final 1991, after eliminated Galatasaray SK.

UEFA rankingsUEFA Country Ranking for league participation in 2019–20 European football season (Previous year rank in italics)
 47  (45)  Erovnuli Liga
 48  (50)  Welsh Premier League
 49  (44)  Montenegrin First League 50  (51)  Faroe Islands Premier League
 51  (52)  Gibraltar Premier Division

Stadiums

Prva CFL has been played in 20 stadiums since its first edition. The biggest stadium, used by FK Budućnost, is Podgorica City Stadium. It is the only stadium whose capacity is more than 10,000 seats. There are four other stadiums with a capacity of more than 5,000 seats, while five stadiums meet UEFA criteria - Podgorica City Stadium, Stadium in Nikšić, Sveti Petar Cetinjski, DG Arena and Stadium in Petrovac. Below is the list of stadiums on which members of Prva CFL have played from season 2006-07 until now.

Logo and sponsorships
Official logo and equipment
Since establishment, the Montenegrin First League has had two official logos. 

The first logo was presented in 2006. Rebranding of the league came in 2018, together with the new logos of the Montenegrin Cup, Montenegrin Second League and youth leagues.

The official ball of the competition is produced under the Derbystar brand, while the official equipment of referees is a product of Legea.

Sponsorships
Name of the competition
Since foundation, the main sponsor of Montenegrin First League has been Montenegrin 'Telekom' which operates under the T-Com / T-Mobile brand. Since July 2022, the main sponsor of the First Montenegrin Football League is Meridianbet company.
 2006–2011: T-Com 1. CFL 2011–2022: Telekom 1. CFL 2022–present: Meridianbet 1. CFL'Broadcasting rights
Since the foundation of the competition, official broadcaster of First Montenegrin League matches is the national television station of Montenegro - RTCG. Matches of 1. CFL are directly broadcasting at RTCG channel 2, with most important matches on satellite programming.

From season 2017–18, broadcaster of matches is regional group Arena Sport. Every weekend, one game is broadcast live on Arena Sport channel. Since season 2018–19, some games of Prva CFL are broadcast by cable-network channel MNE Sport TV''.

See also
Montenegrin First League playoffs
Montenegrin Cup
Montenegrin clubs in European football competitions
Montenegrin Derby
Montenegrin Second League
Football in Montenegro
Montenegrin Women's League
Montenegrin clubs in Yugoslav football competitions (1946-2006)
Montenegrin Football Championship (1922-1940)
Montenegrin Republic League
Montenegrin Futsal First League

References

External links
League by Weltfussballarchiv  
Football Association of Montenegro - Official Site
League on soccerway.com
on CGF

 
Montenegro
1
Recurring sporting events established in 2004
2004 establishments in Montenegro